Malik is a surname deriving from the Arabic word malik, meaning "king" or "chieftain". The title "Malik" was granted to many Muslims in Kashmir, and began to be used a surname in the 14th century.

Notable people

References

Hindu surnames
Punjabi-language surnames
Indian surnames